Just Looking is a 1999 American comedy-drama film. Directed by Jason Alexander and written by Marshall Karp, it stars Ryan Merriman, Gretchen Mol, Peter Onorati, and Patti LuPone. The film's plot follows Lenny, a teenage boy from the Bronx who is sent to Queens to live with his aunt and new uncle for one summer in the 1950s. Hormonal and curious about sex, Lenny's goal for the summer is to “witness an act of love”.

The film premiered in October 1999 at the Hamptons International Film Festival and received a limited theatrical release in October 2000.

Plot
Lenny is a 14-year-old boy living in the Bronx in 1955. Like every teenage boy, he is totally fascinated with the concept of sex. But Lenny is too young and scared to actually "do it”, so he dedicates his summer vacation to the next best thing—seeing two other people in an “act of love”, which proves to be easier said than done. Caught in the act of spying, his mother Sylvia and stepfather ship him off to spend the summer with his Aunt Norma and Uncle Phil in "the country"—Queens.

Lenny's plan looks like a bust and his summer seems destined for boredom until he meets a whole new group of friends, young teens who dub themselves a "sex club." While his new friends don't actually do it either and instead just talk about sex, they have a lot more interesting information than what was available to Lenny back in the Bronx. Then Lenny meets Hedy, a gorgeous nurse twice his age and a former model for bra ads. Lenny is both smitten and inspired, and his goal for the summer kicks into high gear. Lenny's adolescent fascination with sex turns into a deeper story about growing up, betrayal, loneliness, and defining what an “act of love” really is.

Cast 
 Ryan Merriman as Lenny
 Gretchen Mol as Hedy 
 Patti LuPone as Sylvia
 Peter Onorati as Phil
 Ilana Levine as Norma
 Richard V. Licata as Polinsky
 John Bolger as Donald

Reception 
Just Looking has a 45% approval rating on review aggregate website Rotten Tomatoes. In a mixed review, Stephen Holden of The New York Times wrote, “Just Looking is a candy-colored, unabashedly sentimental movie whose characters, for all their flaws, are basically decent people doing their best in sparer times than today. As in so many retrospective rite-of-passage movies, the film's view of the past is the smoothed-out double vision of a grown-up reliving his own adolescence but with an adult perspective that discerns structure and meaning in events. The film's lovely performances embody this double vision”. However, he critiqued the storytelling and tone as “a little too sugary…to be a period classic like Barry Levinson's ‘Diner’”.

Marjorie Baumgarten of The Austin Chronicle wrote though “Just Looking won't become a mainstay of the prolific coming-of-age drama, but, as its title indicate, it may be worth a perusal—especially if you're tired of the way teen sexuality is portrayed in movies from the post-Porky's generations”.

References

External links
 
 Just Looking at Rotten Tomatoes
 Just Looking at AllMovie

American coming-of-age comedy films
1999 films
1990s coming-of-age comedy films
Films directed by Jason Alexander
Films shot in New York City
Films shot in New Jersey
1999 comedy films
American sex comedy films
Films about puberty
Films set in 1955
Films produced by Jean Doumanian
1999 independent films
Sony Pictures Classics films
1990s English-language films
1990s American films